

The Fairey F.2 was a British fighter prototype in the late 1910s. It was the first aircraft designed entirely by the Fairey Aviation Company.

Development
The F.2 was ordered by the Admiralty in 1916 as a massive, three-seat long-range fighter. Powered by two Rolls-Royce Falcon engines, it was a three-bay biplane with a four-wheel "bedstead" main undercarriage, the wings folding aft from a point outboard of the engines. Armament consisted of a .303 in (7.7 mm) Lewis Gun on a Scarff ring on the extreme nose and a similar installation immediately aft of the wings.

Operational history
Built at Harlington the F.2 was transported by road to Northolt Aerodrome where it first flew on 17 May 1917; however, by then Admiralty interest in the project had waned. The fighter was found to be hard to handle and slow, and therefore no further production was continued.

Operators

Royal Naval Air Service

Specifications

References

 

1910s British fighter aircraft
F.2
Aircraft first flown in 1917
Biplanes
Aircraft with counter-rotating propellers